is a Japanese women's professional shogi player ranked 2-dan.

Women's shogi professional

Promotion history
Kitao has been promoted as follows:
 2-kyū: October 1, 2000
 1-kyū: April 1, 2001
 1-dan: April 1, 2003
 2-dan: August 1, 2013

Note: All ranks are women's professional ranks.

Shogi-related business and promotion activities
Kitao, together with former women's professional  created the game , a simplified version of shogi designed to help beginners learn the game, in 2008: Kitao came up with the rules of the game, while Fujita designed the game's pieces. She is also the representative director and founder of Nekomado (株式会社ねこまど), a shogi promotion, education and publishing company.

Kitao is also credited with discovering Karolina Styczyńska while playing online shogi on the website 81Dojo as part of her efforts at promoting shogi outside of Japan among non-Japanese players. Kitao was quite impressed with the strength of Styczyńska's play, eventually found out who she was and then made arrangements for her to come and practice shogi in Japan. Styczyńska, through Kitao's further encouragement and support, eventually went on to become the first non-Japanese to be awarded any type of professional status by the Japan Shogi Association.

References

External links

ShogiHub: Professional Player Info · Kitao, Madoka
BoardGameGeek: Madoka Kitao
blog: 北尾まどか
old blog: 将棋の輪
 Nekomado

Japanese shogi players
Living people
Women's professional shogi players
Professional shogi players from Tokyo
1980 births
People from Meguro
LPSA